Free South Moluccan Youth is an inactive terrorist organization with the proclaimed goal of restoring South Moluccan independence from Indonesia. The group and its factions were responsible for several attacks in the Netherlands in the late 1970s.

Defunct organizations designated as terrorist